The PS Magna Charta is a former paddlesteamer ferry built for the Manchester, Sheffield and Lincolnshire Railway in 1873. The Magna Charta was used as a ferry crossing across the River Humber from New Holland to Hull and was built by Charlton & Co. Ltd, Grimsby. During the ship's later days, it was used as a relief ferry and a tug boat until it was broken up in 1924.

References

1873 ships
Ferries of England
Paddle steamers of the United Kingdom
Ships of the London and North Eastern Railway